Zameško is a small settlement on the right bank of the Krka River in the Municipality of Šentjernej in southeastern Slovenia. The entire municipality is part of the traditional region of Lower Carniola and is now included in the Southeast Slovenia Statistical Region.

References

External links

Zameško on Geopedia

Populated places in the Municipality of Šentjernej